The Falkland Islands general election of 2005 was held on Thursday 17 November 2005 to elect members to the Legislative Council. It would be the last general election in the Falkland Islands before the new constitution came into force, which replaced the Legislative Council with the Legislative Assembly. Chief Executive Chris Simpkins acted as Returning Officer.

Eight Councillors were elected through universal suffrage using block voting, five from the Stanley constituency and three from the Camp constituency. Each elector in Stanley could vote for five candidates, and in Camp each elector could vote for three candidates.

Results
Candidates in bold were elected.  Candidates in italic were incumbents.

Stanley constituency

Camp constituency

References

2005 elections in South America
2005
General election
Non-partisan elections
2005 elections in British Overseas Territories
November 2005 events in South America